Montefiore Cemetery, also known as Old Montefiore Cemetery, is a Jewish cemetery in Springfield Gardens, Queens, New York, established in 1908. The cemetery is called by several names, including Old Montefiore, Springfield, or less commonly, just Montefiore. More than 150,000 have been buried there.

The Shomrim Society, the fraternal society of Jewish officers in the New York City Police Department, has a burial plot for their members in Montefiore Cemetery, and it contains a large granite obelisk erected in 1949.

Notable burials
 Hyman Amberg (1902–1926), mobster
 Joseph C. Amberg (–1926), mobster
 Louis Amberg (1898–1935), mobster
Abraham Coralnik (1883–1937), writer and newspaper editor
 Al "Bummy" Davis (192–1945), boxer
 Herb Edelman (1933–1996), actor
 Israel Lewis Feinberg, M.D. (1872–1941), Coroner of New York County
 Sidney A. Fine (1903–1982), New York state assemblyman, senator, and U.S. congressman
 Fyvush Finkel (1922–2016), actor
 Alexander Granach (1893–1945), actor
 Shemaryahu Gurary (1897–1989), Chabad rabbi
 Philip M. Kleinfeld (1894–1971), New York State assemblyman, senator, and judge
 Oscar Lewis (1914–1970), author and anthropologist
 Lou Limmer (1925–2007), baseball player
Joseph Margoshes (1866–1955), Yiddish journalist
Samuel Margoshes (1887–1968), Yiddish journalist and newspaper editor
 William Meyerowitz (1887–1981), artist
Hans Morgenthau (1904–1980), international relations scholar
Barnett Newman (1905–1970), artist
Joseph Schlossberg (1875–1971), labor activist
Nathan D. Shapiro (1887–1969), lawyer and New York State assemblyman
 Yosef Yitzchak Schneersohn (1880–1950), sixth Lubavitcher Rebbe
 Menachem Mendel Schneerson (1902–1994), seventh Lubavitcher Rebbe
 Arnold Schuster (1927–1952),  Brooklyn clothing salesman and amateur detective
 Aryeh Leib Schochet (1845–1928), Rabbi
 Sholom Secunda (1894–1974), songwriter
 Jacob Shapiro (1899–1947), mobster
 Irwin Steingut (1893–1952), politician, New York State Assemblyman from 1922 to 1952, Speaker of the Assembly in 1935
 Dave Tarras (–1989), musician
 Abraham Telvi (1934–1956), mobster
Peter Weinberger (1956-1956), murder victim

New Montefiore
In 1928, Montefiore Cemetery expanded to a second site in Farmingdale, New York, named New Montefiore Cemetery.

References

External links

 Montefiore Cemeteries Official Website
 

Cambria Heights, Queens
Cemeteries in Queens, New York
Jewish cemeteries in New York City
Laurelton, Queens
Menachem Mendel Schneerson
Yosef Yitzchak Schneersohn
Jews and Judaism in Queens, New York
1908 establishments in New York City
Cemeteries established in the 1900s